Nurabad (also Romanized as Nūrābād; also known as Khūn) is a village in Bushkan Rural District of Bushkan District, Dashtestan County, Bushehr province, Iran. At the 2006 census, its population was 660 in 154 households. The following census in 2011 counted 663 people in 188 households. The latest census in 2016 showed a population of 689 people in 209 households; it was the largest village in its rural district.

References 

Populated places in Dashtestan County